The 1894 Wellington City mayoral election was part of the New Zealand local elections held that same year. The polling was conducted using the standard first-past-the-post electoral method.

Background
In 1894 the incumbent Mayor Alfred Brandon was defeated by Charles Luke, a member of the Wellington Hospital Board.

Results
The following table gives the election results:

Notes

References

Mayoral elections in Wellington
1894 elections in New Zealand
Politics of the Wellington Region
1890s in Wellington